WRZX (1400 kHz) is an AM radio station broadcasting as an affiliate of Fox Sports Radio. Until January 2009, then-WCOH played a classic country format. Licensed to Newnan, Georgia, United States, it serves the Atlanta area. The station is currently owned by iHeartMedia, Inc. as part of the Newnan cluster with WMGP 98.1 and WGST 720, but operated separately from the Atlanta cluster.

History
Located at 1400 kHz, WRZX started broadcasting as WCOH (standing for the ‘City Of Homes’, the official slogan of Newnan for being home to many old homes from the Civil War era) in 1947 with studios located in Downtown Newnan and transmitter site located at 154 Boone Drive in Newnan. WCOH would eventually re-locate and build studios at the same location as its transmitter site on Boone Drive in the 1960s.

In March of 1975, WCOH's tower was destroyed by a tornado. The tower was rebuilt not long after in the same location.

Around 1995, WCOH was sold from Dallas Tarkenton to Mike Easterly and Joe Pedicino's Legacy Media, LLC.

Around 1998, WCOH was acquired by Clear Channel Communications from Legacy Media, LLC.

From 1947 to 2009, WCOH aired a country music/full-service format under the slogan "The Voice Of The City Of Homes." The station featured a wide-array of local programming during this tenure.

In 2009, iHeart flipped WCOH to Sports/Talk as “Fox Sports 1400.” 

On March 26, 2021, the station's tower collapsed in an EF4 tornado that had gone through Newnan early that morning. Because the station had no backup site, the station stayed off-air for a few weeks before placing a crank-up tower in the front of the iHeartMedia Newnan/WCOH transmitter site to temporarily transmit from. 

In July 2021, the station changed its callsign to WRZX, leaving behind the 74 year old heritage WCOH callsign.

As of 2022, WRZX's former studios off of Boone Drive in Newnan have been sold and WRZX's transmitter site has been re-located to the WNEA 1300 AM tower.

External links

RZX (AM)
Radio stations established in 1948
IHeartMedia radio stations
1948 establishments in Georgia (U.S. state)